I.L.P.A.P. was a public Greek company, part of the general Mass Transit System, responsible for the operation of the trolleybuses network. ILPAP was founded on December 14, 1970, and since 1998 the company was owned by the Athens Urban Transport Organisation (Organismos Astikon Syngoinonion Athinon - OASA, Greek: Οργανισμός Αστικών Συγκοινωνιών Αθηνών - Ο.Α.Σ.Α.), a public company.

Overview
In March 2011, the Greek Government passed Law 3920 to merge ILPAP with the bus company ETHEL S.A. The resulting company is named "OSY S.A." and is a subsidiary of OASA S.A. The merger was officially announced on June 10, 2011. While merger at the top management level took place immediately, integration of the former companies at operations and support level proceeds slowly.

The network consisted of 22 trolleybus routes which cover 390 kilometers in Athens urban area. The fleet consisted of 366 trolleybuses, made by Neoplan and Van Hool, 51 of which are articulated. 10.6 million kilometers are covered, and 80 million passengers are transported per year. As of May 2011, the company had about 1,200 employees.

Gallery

References

Transport in Athens
Bus companies of Greece
Defunct companies of Greece